San Luis Creek is a  stream that flows from a source near Poncha Pass in Saguache County, Colorado to San Luis Lake adjacent to Great Sand Dunes National Park.  San Luis Lake is the sink of the San Luis Closed Basin, the largest endorheic basin in Colorado.

See also
List of rivers of Colorado

References

Rivers of Colorado
Rivers of Alamosa County, Colorado
Rivers of Saguache County, Colorado